Lucien is an unincorporated community in Franklin County, Mississippi, United States.

History
Lucien is located on the former Mississippi Central Railroad. The community was named for a Mr. Lucien Scott and was once home to five stores and a cotton gin.

A post office operated under the name Lucien from 1907 to 1972.

Lucien was home to a school until it was consolidated with the school at McCall Creek.

The Central Lumber Company operated a mill in Lucien from 1916 to 1920.

Lucien is home to the Lucien Bridge, which is listed on the National Register of Historic Places.

References

Unincorporated communities in Franklin County, Mississippi
Unincorporated communities in Mississippi